Ennavo Pudichirukku is a 2004 Tamil language romantic thriller film directed by Meenakshi Sundaram. The film stars Kaadhal Kondein fame Sudeep, newcomer Bharani and Sindhuri, with Karunas, Bhuvaneswari, Vittal Rao, S. Sriskandarajah, Madhan Bob, and Kovai Sarala playing supporting roles. The film, produced by S. Sriskandarajah, was released on 26 January 2004.

Plot
Santosh (Sudeep) and Vishwa (Bharani) are brothers with different personalities. They are the sons of Muthaiah (Vittal Rao), a rich NRI businessman. Santosh is a chronic womanizer who believes that money is enough to attract women. Vishwa, on the other hand, is responsible and works in his father's company and believes love is pure and beautiful.

Vishwa and Sangeetha (Sindhuri) fall in love with each other. Sangeetha is from a middle-class family. She lives with her docile brother (S. Sriskandarajah) and her greedy sister-in-law Saroja (Bhuvaneswari). One day, Santosh falls under the spell of Sangeetha and tries to woo her. Sangeetha, annoyed by his crudeness, slaps him in a public place. Santosh, who has never been humiliated like this before, swears that he will marry her and will make her suffer after the marriage. Santosh then pays her sister-in-law Saroja to fulfil his wish.

Later, Santosh realizes that his brother Viswa and Sangeetha are lovers, but even after knowing it, Santosh is determined to make Sangeetha his own. What transpires next forms the rest of the story.

Cast

Sudeep as Santosh
Bharani as Vishwa
Sindhuri as Sangeetha
Karunas as Peela Magan
Bhuvaneswari as Saroja
Vittal Rao as Muthaiah
S. Sriskandarajah as Sangeetha's brother
Madhan Bob
Kovai Senthil as Gurukkal
Vellai Subbaiah as Iyer
Vijay Ganesh as Tea Master
Radha Rani as Annapoorani
Nindhu as Aishwarya
Madurai Selvam
Chelladurai
Neepa

Production
S. Sriskandarajah, an NRI businessman from Norway had ventured into a Tamil film Ennavo Pudichirukku. Sudeep, who signed to play the lead role, said, "After Kaadhal Kondein I got many offers. I was waiting for a meaty role, which I finally got in this film. Its a challenging role for me". Sindhuri who played the second heroine in Boys is doing the female lead. Bharani, an NRI from Canada was introduced as the second hero. Subhash Jawahar debuted as the music director. The film's songs had been shot at picturesque locales of Pondicherry, Munnar, Chalakudy and Chennai.

Soundtrack

The film score and the soundtrack were composed by Subhash Jawahar. The soundtrack, released in 2004, features 5 tracks with lyrics written by Rasi Azhagappan, Sukumar, Bharathi Priyan and Ilayakumar.

Reception
The film received negative reviews from critics with Balaji Balasubramaniam of bbthots.com stating, "this movie is amateurish in both romance and thrills and to make matters worse, incorporates an intolerable comedy track". Another critic from bizhat.com said, "Sudeep has impressed in the villain role. Newcomer Bharani is ok. Sindhuri’s acting stands out especially in the scene when she is torn between the two brothers".

References

2004 films
2000s Tamil-language films
2000s romantic thriller films
Indian romantic thriller films
Films shot in Chalakudy
Films shot in Chennai
Films shot in Munnar
Films shot in Puducherry
2004 directorial debut films
Films shot in Thrissur